Matias Marttinen (born 25 June 1990, in Rauma) is a Finnish politician currently serving in the Parliament of Finland for the National Coalition Party at the Satakunta constituency.

References

1990 births
Living people
People from Rauma, Finland
National Coalition Party politicians
Members of the Parliament of Finland (2019–23)